Julian David Cope (born 21 October 1957) is an English musician and author. He was the singer and songwriter in Liverpool post-punk band the Teardrop Explodes and has followed a solo career since 1983 in addition to working on musical side projects such as Queen Elizabeth, Brain Donor and Black Sheep.

Cope is also an author on Neolithic culture, publishing The Modern Antiquarian in 1998, and a political and cultural activist with a public interest in occultism and paganism.  He has written two volumes of autobiography, Head-On (1994) and Repossessed (1999); two volumes of archaeology, The Modern Antiquarian (1998) and The Megalithic European (2004); and three volumes of musicology, Krautrocksampler (1995), Japrocksampler (2007); and Copendium: A Guide to the Musical Underground (2012).

Early life
Cope's family resided in Tamworth, Staffordshire, but he was born in Deri, Glamorgan, Wales, where his mother's parents lived, while she was staying there. Cope was staying with his grandmother near Aberfan on his ninth birthday, the day of the Aberfan disaster of 1966, which he has described as a key event of his childhood.

He grew up in Tamworth with his parents and his younger brother Joss.  He played Oliver in Wilnecote High School's production of the musical. Cope attended City of Liverpool C.F. Mott Training College (now Liverpool John Moores University), and it was here that he first became involved in music.

Music

1976–77: Early bands

In July 1977, Cope was one of the founders of Crucial Three, a Liverpool punk rock band in which he played bass guitar. Although the Crucial Three lasted for little more than six weeks and disbanded without ever playing in public, all three members eventually went on to lead successful Liverpool post-punk bands—singer Ian McCulloch with Echo & the Bunnymen and guitarist Pete Wylie with the Mighty Wah!. Post-Crucial Three, Cope, and McCulloch initially went on to form other short-lived bands UH? and A Shallow Madness (Cope had also spent time with Wylie in another short-lived band, Nova Mob). When Cope sacked McCulloch from A Shallow Madness, McCulloch went on to form Echo and the Bunnymen. The two former bandmates would maintain a frequently antagonistic rivalry from then on, often carried out in public or in the press.

1978–1983: The Teardrop Explodes

In 1978, Cope formed the Teardrop Explodes with drummer Gary Dwyer, organist Paul Simpson and guitarist Mick Finkler, with himself as singer, bass player and principal songwriter. Drawing on a post-punk version of West Coast pop music (which gained the nickname of "bubblegum trance"), the band became part of a wave of neo-psychedelic Liverpool bands. Cope and Dwyer (and later their manager-turned-keyboard player David Balfe, who served both as Cope's creative foil and his personal antagonist) were the only band constants, although seven other members passed in and out of the lineup during the band's fractious four-year existence. Several well-received early singles (including "Sleeping Gas" and "Treason") culminated in the band's biggest hit, "Reward", which hit number 6 in the UK singles chart and took the Kilimanjaro album to number 24 in the album charts. Cope's photogenic charm and wild, garrulous interview style helped keep the band in the media eye, and made him a short-lived teen idol during the band's peak.

Success brought the Teardrops plenty of attention, but no further stability. Their second album Wilder experimented with different and darker psychedelic styles, as well as delving deeper into Cope's complicated psyche: it spawned no major hits and sold relatively poorly at the time (despite being critically praised in retrospect). Excessive drug use plus continued infighting undermined the band, and a final lineup of Cope, Dwyer and Balfe split apart in 1982 after failed attempts to record a third album and a final disastrous tour.

Despite the relatively short life of the band, The Teardrop Explodes has continued to sustain interest and praise since its demise and the band's back catalogue of recordings has been reissued several times over the last thirty years. Cope, however, has strenuously resisted taking advantage of any nostalgic and commercial opportunities to reunite the band.

1982–85: The Mercury years – World Shut Your Mouth and Fried
In 1982 (accompanied by his new American wife Dorian Beslity), Cope moved to the Staffordshire village of Drayton Bassett (close to his childhood home of Tamworth). Following the break up of the Teardrop Explodes, he spent a period in seclusion recovering from the strain of the group's final year. Cope's well-documented Teardrops-era LSD excesses, eccentric behaviour and subsequent retreat had led to him being labelled an "acid casualty" in the vein of Syd Barrett and Roky Erikson, an image which took him several years to shake off. During this period, Cope befriended a teenage Drayton Bassett musician called Donald Ross Skinner, who became his main musical foil for the next twelve years.

In 1983 Cope began recording the songs for his first solo album, World Shut Your Mouth. Although the album generally retained the uptempo pop drive of the Teardrops, it was also an introspective and surreal work with many references to childhood. Former Teardrops drummer Gary Dwyer, guitarist Steve Lovell and Dream Academy oboist Kate St John all contributed to the album, which was released on Mercury Records in March 1984. World Shut Your Mouth was seen as out-of-step with the times, gained poor reviews and sold indifferently. A single from the album, "Sunshine Playroom", featured a disturbing video directed by David Bailey. During a concert at Hammersmith Palais on the subsequent promotional tour, Cope slashed across his bare stomach with a broken microphone stand in an act of frustrated self-mutilation. Although the wounds were superficial, it shocked the audience and resulted in another memorable addition to his reputation for bizarre behaviour.

World Shut Your Mouth was followed six months later by 1984's Fried album for which Cope was joined by Skinner, Lovell, St John, ex-Waterboys drummer Chris Whitten and Wah! guitarist Steve "Brother Johnno" Johnson. The album was much more raw in approach than its predecessor, and although in many respects it prefigured the looser and more mystical style which Cope would follow and be praised for in the next decade, it sold poorly at the time (as did the accompanying single "Sunspots"). Notoriously, the sleeve featured a naked Cope crouched on top of the Alvecote Mound slag heap clad only in a large turtle shell. The album includes a song called "Bill Drummond Said" about Cope's A&R man at WEA, to which future KLF star Drummond responded with a song titled "Julian Cope Is Dead", pondering how much more famous Cope might have been had he been shot at the height of his fame. The commercial failure of Fried led to Polygram dropping Cope; he subsequently engaged a new manager Cally Callomon, and signed a deal with Island Records.

1986–1992: The Island years

1986–1990: Saint Julian and My Nation Underground

With Cally's encouragement, Cope made the effort to clean up and compete. He formed a new backing group (informally known as the "Two-Car Garage Band") featuring Skinner, Whitten, former Teardrops associate James Eller on bass guitar, and himself on vocals, rhythm guitar and assorted keyboards (Cope performed the latter under the alias of "Double DeHarrison" until the band hired Richard Frost as full-time keyboard player). This band lineup recorded Cope's third solo album Saint Julian, mostly composed of crisp and memorable rock songs. It was trailed by the single "World Shut Your Mouth", which became Cope's biggest solo hit, reaching No. 19 in the UK in 1986 and becoming his only Top 20 solo hit. The parent album was well received and generated two more singles ("Trampolene" and "Eve's Volcano") but the fresh momentum did not last. Cope fell out with Callomon, and the Two-Car Garage band disintegrated as Eller joined The The and Whitten left for Paul McCartney's band.

Back in London, and with only the faithful Skinner remaining, Cope enlisted his A&R man Ron Fair as producer and recorded a follow-up album called My Nation Underground. This featured a varied lineup of musicians including Fair, Skinner, Danny Thompson, eccentric percussionist Rooster Cosby (who was to remain a close Cope associate) and assorted sessions musicians (some of whom, such as James Eller, had contributed to the previous album). My Nation Underground produced only one Top 40 single, "Charlotte Anne", which also met with modest American success by reaching the top of the Modern Rock Tracks. Subsequent singles "5 O'Clock World" (a cover of a 1965 Vogues song) and the orchestral pop ballad "China Doll" both charted considerably lower, disappointing Island Records and further discouraging Cope, who had not enjoyed making the record and did not believe that it represented him properly as an artist.

To comfort himself, Cope spent a single illicit weekend at the end of the My Nation Underground sessions to create a second, lo-fi and unauthorised album called Skellington. Recorded in the same studio used for My Nation Underground on Island's money (and predominantly featuring the same core team of Cope, Skinner, Cosby and Fair) it was seen by Cope as a far more genuine artistic statement recorded at a fraction of the money and time. Neither Island Records nor Cope's current management team had any desire to release Skellington and Cope refused to record any other material while he feuded with them to try to get his new work released. Eventually, Skellington was released on the tiny Zippo label later in 1989, showing the poor relations between Cope and Island.

In 1990, Cope followed up Skellington with a second lo-fi album called Droolian, also recorded over three days. It was released only in Texas (on another small label, Mofoco) and the profits were used to aid of one of Cope's heroes, the former 13th Floor Elevators frontman Roky Erickson, who at that time was in jail without legal representation.

1991–92: Peggy Suicide and Jehovahkill

During this period, Cope discovered the book Guitar Army: Rock and Revolution with The MC5 and the White Panther Party by John Sinclair. He later described it as his "Holy Book" and enthusiastically embraced its one-take approach to making and recording music (as well as its message of rock- and-roll being a weapon of cultural revolution). This method typified Cope's musical approach from then on, as he forever left behind the more measured and constructed approach of Saint Julian and The Teardrop Explodes in favour of more spontaneous expression.
 
Having repaired his relationship with Island Records, Cope began recording his next record against the background of the civil demonstrations which became the Poll Tax Riots. Cope joined the demonstrations and took a prominent role in them. Wearing a huge theatrical costume throughout the march, he was later featured on the BBC's Poll Tax documentary, a lone protester walking down Whitehall surrounded by seven lines of mounted police.

These (and other) elements fed into the double album Peggy Suicide, which was released on Island Records in 1991 and was heralded by critics as Cope's best work to date. On the album's songs, Cope laid bare many of his personal convictions including his hatred of organized religion and his increasing public interest in women's rights, the occult, alternative spirituality (including paganism and Goddess worship), animal rights, and ecology. Skinner, Rooster Cosby, Ron Fair and former Smiths drummer Mike Joyce all contributed to the record, as did a new sidekick in the shape of future Spiritualized lead guitarist Michael Watts (better known as Mike Mooney or "Moon-eye"). Although the album produced another well-received single ("Beautiful Love") the political content of Peggy Suicide caused more friction with Island, who had signed Cope as a marketable hit-making alternative rocker but increasingly found themselves dealing with a latter-day counter-culturalist and revolutionary. Cope toured the album, including several dates in Japan which were recorded (although the results were not released until 2004, on the live album Live Japan '91.)

In 1992, Cope released another double album. Jehovahkill, on Island Records. Musically, the album reflected his interest in Krautrock (though in a more electro-acoustic based form) and his teenage fascination for Detroit hard rock. (A deluxe edition, with a disc of extra material, was released fourteen years later in 2006). Lyrically, the album was fiercely anti-Christian, with such songs as "Poet is Priest", "Julian H. Cope", and the single "Fear Loves This Place" espousing Cope's Paganesque perspective and being highly critical of the established Church. The content (and lack of sales) proved to be too much for Island Records. Despite the album reaching the UK Top 20, the label dropped Cope in the same week that his three shows sold out at London's 1,800 capacity Town & Country Club. The music press mounted an outcry at Island's decision, with the New Musical Express (NME) featuring him on their front cover under the headline "Endangered Species" while Select magazine started a campaign to have Cope re-signed. Engaged in a tour of the Highlands and Islands of Scotland, Cope refused to comment.

1993–96: Rite to 20 Mothers and Interpreter

From this point onwards, Cope began to take greater personal control of his career and business affairs. While he continued to sign contracts with established record labels, he would begin to release more esoteric projects independently. The first of these projects (issued on Cope's own K.A.K. label) was a collaboration with Donald Ross Skinner: an album of instrumental jams called Rite, inspired by Krautrock, Sly Stone-styled psychedelic funk and spiritual mysticism. Cope also took the opportunity to issue The Skellington Chronicles (an expanded version of Skellington along with a follow-up album in the same vein called Skellington 2: He's Back ... and this time it's personal) and would record a number of tracks released eighteen years later as 2011's The Jehovahcoat Demos. During this period, Cope began his work as a writer, completing the first volume of his autobiography and beginning to research works on Krautrock and Neolithic architecture.

Signing to the Def Jam subsidiary American Recordings for a one-off album deal, Cope recorded Autogeddon, which was released in 1994. Continuing to build on the musical approach of Peggy Suicide and Jehovahkill but with a greater element of space rock, the album used the automobile as its central metaphor for individual and collective struggles between responsibility and selfishness, along with further stabs at patriarchy. Autogeddon was the first Cope album to feature synthesizer player Thighpaulsandra, who would become another key Cope collaborator. In the same year, Cope and Thighpaulsandra would form the ambient-electronic project Queen Elizabeth: the eponymous Queen Elizabeth album was released on the Echo Label, Cope's mainstream home for the next two years.
 
Cope's next album under his own name was 1995's 20 Mothers which revisited many of his existing lyrical preoccupations but with a more sprawling and eclectic musical approach (including stronger elements of pop and folk) and more directly personal and reflective material dealing with Cope's own family. The album received very positive reviews and also spawned Cope's last hit to date, the Top 40 single "Try, Try, Try", which led to two Top of the Pops performances. The subsequent British live tour (featuring Cosby, Mooney, Thighpaulsandra, and keyboard-player-turned-bass-guitarist Richard Frost) was fraught with tension, and Mooney subsequently moved on to Spiritualized. Cope had also parted company with his long-term foil Donald Ross Skinner during the recording of 20 Mothers, although the parting was relatively amicable.

Having been dropped by Echo when he refused to visit the US, Cope then signed to Cooking Vinyl and delivered the Interpreter album in 1996. This continued in a similar but more disciplined vein to its predecessor, with stronger elements of techno and humour (as exemplified in songs like "Cheap New Age Fix") among the more serious topics, such as those inspired by Cope's attendance at the Newbury Bypass protests.

1997–present: Head Heritage

1997–2006: Assorted solo and collaborative work; Brain Donor

Cope's battle with music industry operatives (whom he referred to as "greedheads") saw him finally turn his back on the mainstream music industry from this point onwards. From 1997, Cope opted for full career independence, launching his Head Heritage organisation as combined record label, website and discussion forum.

The first Head Heritage release was 1997's Rite 2, Cope's follow up to 1993's Rite (with Thighpaulsandra taking over from Donald Ross Skinner as creative foil). It was followed in the same year by the second Queen Elizabeth album, QE2: Elizabeth Vagina, which expanded on its predecessor's cosmic rock experiments. Thighpaulsandra would then follow Michael Mooney into Spiritualized (as would Cope's string arranger Martin Shellard), once more depriving Cope of a key collaborator. Cope's next full solo album was 1999's Odin, which consisted of a single 73-minute mantra for voices and electronics (although Thighpaulsandra has claimed credit for some of the work).

In 1999, Cope launched another side project. This was the garage-rock/heavy metal power trio Brain Donor, which featured Cope on bass, Anthony "Doggen" Foster on guitar and Spiritualized's Kevin "Kevlar" Bales on drums. The band was as much theatrical as musical, featuring full face makeup, platform boots and ostentatious double-neck guitars. Cope stated that the band's aim was to fuse the swaggering arena rock of KISS and Van Halen with elements of Japanese heavy metal, Detroit garage rock and Blue Cheer. He also described Brain Donor as "pure white lightning played by forward-thinking motherfuckers" while also asserting that he loathed the "microcephalous ass (of) real heavy metal", seeing Brain Donor as part of his ongoing shamanic efforts.

In 2000, Cope released another solo album – An Audience with the Cope. While appearing to be pitched as a retrospective live recording, it consisted of a series of newly written psychedelic studio jams.

Since 1998, Cope had developed a parallel reputation as a serious antiquarian. This resulted in his 2001 album Discover Odin being a limited-edition tie-in with a talk he had given at the British Museum, featuring a mixture of spoken-word tracks exploring Nordic mythology and various musical tracks including a Cope setting of the epic Norse poem "Hávamál". In the same year Head Heritage released the first two Brain Donor singles, "She Saw Me Coming" and "Get Off Your Pretty Face", followed by the début Brain Donor album Love Peace & Fuck. Cope, Doggen and a returning Thighpaulsandra also teamed up as the drummer-less psychedelic/meditational heavy metal group L.A.M.F. who released the Ambient Metal album the same year. Brain Donor's "Get Back on It" single followed in 2002, as did the third album in Cope's Rite series, Rite Now.
 
In 2003, Cope performed at the Glastonbury Festival as well as launching his own three-day Rome Wasn't Burned in a Day event. A tie-in album, also called Rome Wasn't Burned in a Day, was released to mark the event and included an "eight-minute long Armenian epic" called "Shrine of the Black Youth (Tukh Manukh)". The album was recorded by a trio of Cope, synth player Christopher Patrick "Holy" McGrail and Donald Ross Skinner (returning to work with Cope after seven years). The year also saw more Brain Donor activity via the "My Pagan Ass" single and the album Too Freud To Rock'n'Roll, Too Jung To Die and an appearance on Sunn O)))'s collaborative album White1 with Cope reciting occultic druid poetry on the opening track, "My Wall".

Cope released two more albums in 2005. The first of these was the long-delayed Citizen Cain'd, an album which Cope had promised for several years and now delivered as a short double album (71 minutes over two discs) sold at a single album price. (According to Cope, the two-disc format was due to some of the songs being "too psychologically exhausting" to fit together onto a single album). The second album, Dark Orgasm was a forthright hard-rock exercise which Cope described as "a violent sequence of outcast broadsides leveled at the coming new 21st-century conservatism." Meanwhile, Brain Donor (proving to be an enduring Cope project) was presented to America via a self-titled compilation album. Plans to tour the United States were dropped because the INS refused to grant Cope a visa.

2006 saw the release of the third proper Brain Donor album (Drain'd Boner) and the fourth album in the Rite series (Rite Bastard).

2007–present: Black Sheep and beyond

Cope's 2007 album, You Gotta Problem With Me, was something of a return to his early solo material: more post-punk styled, and featuring swathes of Mellotron and orchestral percussion. Conceptually, it continued his attacks on religion, bigotry, corporate greed and environmental destruction. As with Citizen Cain'd, Cope divided the fifty-six minutes of material across two CDs and also included lavish packaging including printed poems.

You Gotta Problem With Me was followed by 2008's Black Sheep, which Cope described as "a musical exploration of what it is to be an outsider in modern Western Culture" and which featured his most outrightly anarchic pronouncements to date. Dominated by Mellotron, hand drums and acoustic guitars, the album also featured Doggen and McGrail plus new recruits Michael O'Sullivan and Ady "Acoustika" Fletcher. In November 2008, Cope released the Preaching Revolution EP, mingling acoustic protest songs with rockabilly pieces: along with material from the unreleased Diggers, Ranters, Levellers EP, these songs would be reissued on Cope's limited-edition Cope solo album, The Unruly Imagination.

Cope, McGrail, O'Sullivan, and Acoustika went on to form a new ten-piece Cope side project (also called Black Sheep) which included new cohorts such as drummer Antony "Antronhy" Hodgkinson, "Fat Paul" Horlick and former Universal Panzies leader Christophe F. To date, Black Sheep has generated two further albums, both released in 2009 – Kiss My Sweet Apocalypse and Black Sheep at the BBC. 2009 also saw the release of a fourth Brain Donor album (Wasted Fuzz Excessive) and a live Queen Elizabeth album  Hall, recorded in 2000.

Writing

Music commentary

Cope has long been an avid champion of obscure and underground music. While still a member of the Teardrop Explodes, he was instrumental in the critical rehabilitation of the reclusive singer Scott Walker, compiling Fire Escape in the Sky: The Godlike Genius of Scott Walker for release by Bill Drummond's Zoo Records. This sparked renewed interest in the work of Walker (although years later Cope commented that the singer's "Pale White Intellectual" outlook on life no longer held any fascination for him).

Cope established himself as a musicologist with his books Krautrocksampler, Japrocksampler and Copendium. Released Scorpions and Karat "krautrock" by the British music press. Reviews at the time were ecstatic, with Daily Telegraph citing it as "a work of real passion and scholarship". SMASH hits agreed: "This is a superb book ... this is an extraordinary book." Bunty] went further, writing: "Brilliantly researched, Krautrocksampler abounds with revelations, and Cope's enthusiasm verges on the lethal ... a sort of lysergic Lester Bangs." In the Sunday Times, the reviewer wrote: "German 1970s minimalism is invading the British rock scene ... an Englishman is to blame ... Krautrocksampler is a lively history of a fascinating period, half encyclopedia, half psychedelic detective story."

Cope's writing has also won respect in academic circles. His second work as a musicologist, Japrocksampler – subtitled How the post war Japanese blew their minds on rock and roll – was published by HarperCollins in October 2007.

His Album of the Month reviews on the Unsung section of his website (collected and published in 2012 as Copendium) have promoted bands such as Comets on Fire, Sunn O))) (with whom he performed a guest vocal on their White1 album) and several Japanese bands which feature in Japrocksampler. Unsung is another community-based site that invites contributors' reviews, and Cope and the site's numerous contributors have been instrumental in kick-starting the interest in bands like Sir Lord Baltimore, Blue Cheer, Les Rallizes Denudes, Tractor and the Groundhogs. Cope is also considered to be one of the first bloggers; he has been airing his sometimes controversial views since 1997 via his website's "Address Drudion" on the first day of each month.

Archaeology and antiquarianism

1998 saw the release of Cope's bestseller The Modern Antiquarian, a large and comprehensive full-colour 448-page work detailing stone circles and other ancient monuments of prehistoric Britain, which sold out of its first edition of 20,000 in its first month of publication and was accompanied by a BBC Two documentary. The Times called the book: "A ripping good read ... it is deeply impressive ... ancient history: the new rock 'n' roll." The Independent said: "A unique blend of information, observation, personal experience and opinion which is as unlike the normal run of archaeology books as you can imagine." The historian Ronald Hutton went further, calling the book: "the best popular guide to Neolithic and Bronze Age monuments for half a century."

The Modern Antiquarian was followed in 2004 with an even larger 484-page study of similar monuments across Europe entitled The Megalithic European, the most extensive study of European megalithic sites to date. In addition to his books on prehistoric monuments, Cope hosts a community-based Modern Antiquarian website that invites contributors to add their own knowledge of the ancient sites of Britain and Ireland. Cope has lectured nationally on the subject of prehistory, and also at the British Museum on the subjects of Avebury and Odin, where Cope appeared in five-inch platform boots and his hairspray set off fire alarms, causing the building to be evacuated.

Fiction
On 19 June 2014 Cope's first novel One Three One, subtitled "A Time-Shifting Gnostic Hooligan Road Novel", was published by Faber & Faber. Named for a Sardinian motorway, One Three One was well reviewed by The Guardian who wrote that "the musician's fiction debut is brilliant, serious, funny – and completely bonkers". Comedian Stewart Lee interviewed Cope for The Quietus and admits that "there were whole swathes of One Three One where I couldn't tell what was going on (or) which time stream we were in...but I didn't care".

Cope writes about many fictional bands and musicians in the book and has recorded music in the guise of these characters, some of which he has released under the same fictional pseudonyms. Other musical artists have collaborated with Cope for these releases, also under the book's fictional names, including Stephen O'Malley and Holy McGrail (as drone group Vesuvio) and with Robert Courtney and Donald Ross Skinner (as ravers Dayglo Maradona), amongst others. These releases were released via various imprints of Cope's Head Heritage label.

Discography

Studio albums

Live albums
2004 Live Japan '91
2019 Barrowlands - live in Glasgow 1995

Compilation albums
1992 Floored Genius – The Best of Julian Cope and the Teardrop Explodes 1979–91 (UK #22)
1993 Floored Genius 2 – Best of the BBC Sessions 1983–91 (compilation of material recorded for BBC Radio)
1997 The Followers of Saint Julian (rarities compilation)
1997 Leper Skin – An Introduction To Julian Cope ("best of")
2000 Floored Genius 3 – Julian Cope's Oddicon of Lost Rarities & Versions 1978–98 (rarities)
2002 The Collection (1983–1992)
2007 Christ vs Warhol (rarities)
2009 Floored Genius 4 – The Best of Foreign Radio, Rare TV Appearances, Festival Songs & Miscellaneous Lost Classics 1983–2009 (rarities)
2015 Trip Advizer – The Very Best of Julian Cope 1999–2014 ("best of")
2019 Cope's Notes #1: The Teardrop Explodes (1978–1982) (recitations and poems performed over lost Teardrop Explodes grooves)
2021 Cold War Psychedelia (1982 demos for the Teardrop Explodes and music prepared in 1989 for Head-On)
2021 Cope's Notes #2: Droolian (re-release of Droolian with unreleased companion album Droolian's Mother)
2022 Cope's Notes #3: World Shut Your Mouth (demos, spoken word, and previously unreleased music)

Singles

Notes
A^ "Competition" charted at No. 30 on the UK Independent Chart.
B^ "World Shut Your Mouth" also charted on Billboard Mainstream Rock Tracks chart at No. 22 and the five track 12" EP charted at No. 109 on the Billboard 200 album chart.

Collaborations and other projects

With Queen Elizabeth
1994 Queen Elizabeth
1997 QE2: Elizabeth Vagina
2009 Queen Elizabeth Hall

With L.A.M.F.
2001 Ambient Metal

With Brain Donor
2001 "She Saw Me Coming" (single)
2001 "Get Off Your Pretty Face" (single)
2001 Love Peace & Fuck
2002 "Get Back on It" (single)
2003 "My Pagan Ass" (single)
2003 Too Freud To Rock'n'Roll, Too Jung To Die
2005 Brain Donor (U.S. compilation album)
2006 Drain'd Boner
2009 Wasted Fuzz Excessive

With Black Sheep
2009 Kiss My Sweet Apocalypse
2009 Black Sheep at the BBC

With Sunn O)))
2003 My Wall

With various (One Three One related releases)
2014 Neon Sardinia – S’akkabadòra-Hèmina
2014 Dayglo Maradona – Rock Section / American Werewolf EP
2014 Dayglo Maradona – "Rock Section (Andrew Weatherall remix)"
2014 Vesuvio – Vesuvio

With Dope
2017 Dope 
2017 Guerilla Grow
2018 Seven Disquieting Dirges: Performed by Sub Bass Madmen & Throwback F.X. Contrarians
2018 Dope on Drugs
2018 Village Idiot Dope
2019 Black Math
2019 Odin on Acid

Bibliography 
 Head-on: Memories of the Liverpool Punk Scene and the Story of The Teardrop Explodes, 1976–82 (1994)
 Krautrocksampler: One Head's Guide to the Great Kosmische Musik – 1968 Onwards (1995)
 The Modern Antiquarian: A Pre-Millennial Odyssey through Megalithic Britain (1998)
 Repossessed: Shamanic Depressions in Tamworth & London (1983–89) (1999)
 The Megalithic European: The 21st Century Traveller in Prehistoric Europe (2004)
 Japrocksampler: How the Post-war Japanese Blew Their Minds on Rock 'n' Roll (2007)
 Copendium: An Expedition into the Rock 'n' Roll Underworld (2012)
 One Three One (2014)

References

External links
 Head Heritage – Julian Cope's own site
 Guardian bio
 
 

1957 births
English bass guitarists
English male guitarists
Male bass guitarists
English male singers
English songwriters
People from Caerphilly
Musicians from Liverpool
People from Tamworth, Staffordshire
Alumni of Liverpool John Moores University
Living people
Crucial Three members
The Teardrop Explodes members
Island Records artists
Scouse culture of the early 1980s
British post-punk musicians
English modern pagans
Performers of modern pagan music
English occultists
British male songwriters